Tomas Stabell (born 30 January 2002) is a Norwegian footballer who plays as a midfielder.

Career statistics

Club

Notes

References

2002 births
Living people
Norwegian footballers
Association football midfielders
Tromsø IL players
IF Fløya players
Eliteserien players